Durham TurfDogs were a Canadian professional indoor lacrosse team that played in the Canadian Lacrosse League. The TurfDogs, along with the Oshawa Machine, played out of the GM Centre in Oshawa, Ontario.

History
The TurfDogs played their first game on January 7, 2012 in Hagersville, Ontario, which was a loss to the Peel Avengers 16-9.

Season-by-season record
Note: GP = Games played, W = Wins, L = Losses, T = Ties, OTL = Overtime losses, Pts = Points, GF = Goals for, GA = Goals against

References

External links
Official CLax website

Canadian Lacrosse League
Lacrosse teams in Ontario
Sport in Oshawa
Lacrosse clubs established in 2011
2011 establishments in Ontario
2016 disestablishments in Ontario
Sports clubs disestablished in 2016